Pyrenophora chaetomioides is a plant pathogen that affects oats.

References

External links 
 Index Fungorum
 USDA ARS Fungal Database

Pyrenophora
Fungal plant pathogens and diseases
Oats diseases
Fungi described in 1891